Mama Said is the second studio album by American rock musician Lenny Kravitz, released in April 1991 by Virgin Records. Guns N' Roses guitarist Slash co-wrote and played on the song "Always on the Run". He also played on the song "Fields of Joy". The song "All I Ever Wanted" was co-written by Sean Lennon.

Although the album has sold enough copies to be certified double platinum, the RIAA still has it listed as platinum. In the UK, the album reached number 8 on the UK Albums Chart. In 2012, Virgin Records released an expanded, double-disc version of the album with a number of remixes and bonus tracks.

Reception
Greg Kot of Chicago Tribune commented "Rather than building on the '60s influences that permeated his 1989 debut, Let Love Rule, Kravitz practically wallows in them on Mama Said... Kravitz`s taste is commendable, and Mama Said sounds admirably gritty and sexy, without big '90s production touches. But until Kravitz begins transforming his influences instead of just copying them, he'll remain a promising but minor artist." Terry Staunton of Record Collector stated "The blanket praise that greeted Kravitz’s 1989 debut Let Love Rule might have made him a prime candidate for difficult second album syndrome, but if anything Mama Said, released two years later, was an even more accomplished set. Rarely had traditional guitar rock and sweet soul merged so confidently, so effortlessly: further proof that we were in the midst of a major talent." Elysa Gardner of Rolling Stone wrote "Rather than synthesizing his influences in a way that allows him some personal expression, Kravitz seemingly aims to acknowledge as many of them as he can in the course of an hour; the result is a rather disjointed album that lacks freshness and distinction. Kravitz continues to demonstrate a talent for crafting and arranging engaging songs; unfortunately, up to this point it has proven less a creative talent than a recreative one."

Track listing
All songs were written by Lenny Kravitz, except where noted.

Original edition
"Fields of Joy" (Michael Kamen, Hal Fredricks) – 3:57 
Arranged by Doug Neslund and Kravitz
"Always on the Run" (Kravitz, Slash) – 3:53 
Featuring Slash
"Stand by My Woman" (Kravitz, Henry Hirsch, Stephen Mark Pasch, Anthony Krizan) – 4:19
"It Ain't Over 'til It's Over" – 3:55
"More Than Anything in This World" – 3:43
"What Goes Around Comes Around" – 4:40 
"The Difference Is Why" – 4:48 
"Stop Draggin' Around" – 2:37
"Flowers for Zoë" – 2:45 
"Fields of Joy (Reprise)" (Kamen, Fredricks) – 3:59
Arranged by Kravitz
"All I Ever Wanted" (Kravitz, Sean Ono Lennon) – 4:04
"When the Morning Turns to Night" – 2:58 
"What the Fuck Are We Saying?" – 5:13
"Butterfly" – 1:50

21st Anniversary Edition Bonus Tracks
Disc One
The Studio B-Sides
 "Light Skin Girl from London" – 2:42
 "I'll Be Around" – 2:55
 "Always on the Run " (Kravitz, Slash) – 3:54
The Unreleased 12"
 "It Ain't Over 'Til It's Over " – 4:37
 "It Ain't Over 'Til It's Over " – 8:08
Disc Two
The Demos: Mama in Progress
 "Riding on the Wings of My Lord " – 3:02
 "It Ain't Over 'Til It's Over " – 2:05
 "What the Fuck Are We Saying? " – 3:35
 "The Difference is Why " – 3:55
 "Riding on the Wings of My Lord " – 3:41
 "Riding on the Wings of My Lord " – 3:03
 "Framed, Lying Crying " – 0:23
 "Stand by My Woman " (Kravitz, Hirsch, Pasch, Krizan) – 4:20
Live in Rotterdam Nov. 15, 1991
 "Stop Draggin' Around" – 3:06
 "Always on the Run" (Kravitz, Slash) – 5:26
 "Fields of Joy" (Kamen, Fredricks) – 4:19
 "Stand by My Woman" (Kravitz, Hirsch, Pasch, Krizan) – 4:59
 "More Than Anything in This World" – 8:16
The Live in Japan B-Sides
 "Always on the Run" (Kravitz, Slash) – 5:20
 "Stop Draggin' Around" – 3:06
 "What the Fuck Are We Saying?" – 5:20

Personnel
 Lenny Kravitz – vocals, guitar, keyboards, bass, drums, electric sitar
 Slash – guitar solos on tracks 1 and 2
 Henry Hirsch – keyboards, bass
 Karl Denson – saxophone on tracks 2, 3, 6 and 13 
 Butch Thomas – saxophone on track 2
 Mike Hunter – trumpet on track 2
 Phenix Horns – horns on track 4
 Zoro – drums on track 6
 Lebron Scott – bass on track 6
 Adam Widoff – guitar on track 6
 David Domanich – drums on track 8
 Nancy Ives – cello on track 9
 Sean Ono Lennon – piano on track 11

Production and design
 Engineering by David Domanich and Henry Hirsch
 Mastered by Greg Calbi at Sterling Sound Studios
 Mixed by Henry Hirsch at Waterfront Studios
 Art direction by Melanie Nissen
 Artwork design by Tom Bouman
 Photography by James Colderaro

Charts

Weekly charts

Year-end charts

Certifications and sales

References

1991 albums
Lenny Kravitz albums
Virgin Records albums
Albums produced by Lenny Kravitz